The 2015 Ugo Agostoni was a one-day cycling semi-classic that took place on 16 September 2015, starting in Monza and finishing in Lissone in northern Italy. It was the first leg of the 2015 Trittico Lombardo and the 69th edition of the Coppa Ugo Agostoni. The race was won by Davide Rebellin, who sprinted to the race victory ahead of his breakaway companion Vincenzo Nibali. Niccolò Bonifazio ( won the sprint for third. Nibali went on to win the Coppa Bernocchi and the Tre Valli Varesine to win the Trittico Lombardo competition.

Results

References

2015 UCI Europe Tour
2015 in Italian sport